The Gardez Fire Base was an American outpost in Afghanistan, near the city of Gardez, in the Province of Paktia, near the border with Pakistan.
The base was approximately 100 kilometers south of Kabul, and was the subject of regular attack in 2003. In mid-August 2011, a truck packed with explosives detonated at the entrance, killing two Afghan guards but otherwise doing minimal damage to the base. The Taliban, however, made spurious claims of massive casualties and destroyed helicopters.

Colonel Burke Garrett published a letter in the Fort Drum Blizzard in which he described the living conditions at the Gardez Fire Base, and its neighboring bases:

FOB Gardez was closed in November of 2014 by the 319th Movement Control Team from Dover, Delaware (Army Reserve). The FOB was run by the 101st Airborne Division, 1st/506 Infantry Easy Co. (Band of Brothers).

See also
Jamal Nasser
Sayed Nabi Siddiqui
 Gardez Air Base

References

External links
 A Silence in the Afghan Mountains Los Angeles Times 24 September 2006
 Two Deaths Were a `Clue That Something's Wrong' Los Angeles Times 25 September 2006

Military installations of the United States in Afghanistan